The Liber Monstrorum (or Liber monstrorum de diversis generibus) is a late seventh-or early eighth-century Anglo-Latin catalogue of marvellous creatures, which may be connected with the Anglo-Saxon scholar Aldhelm. It is transmitted in several manuscripts from the ninth and tenth centuries, but is often studied in connection with the more well known text Beowulf, since the Liber also mentions King Hygelac of the Geats and that he was renowned for his large size. Some scholars argue that the Beowulf-poet was in fact inspired by the Liber Monstrorum. The book contains extraordinary people, such as Hygelac, some clearly historical reports of actual peoples, such as the Ethiopians, and some obviously mythological reports, such as the cyclopes and centaurs. The author however seems to misread several times the classics, whether by mistake or humor.

See also 
 Wonders of the East

References

External links
 A translation, done by Andy Orchard, is available at https://web.archive.org/web/20050118082548/http://members.shaw.ca/sylviavolk/Beowulf3.htm
 Lapidge, Michael. 'Beowulf, Aldhelm, the Liber Monstrorum and Wessex', Studi medievali, 3rd ser., 23 (1982), 151-91

Latin texts of Anglo-Saxon England
7th-century Latin books
8th-century Latin books